Ali Chekr (born 1 July 1937) is a Lebanese épée and foil fencer. He competed at the 1968 and 1972 Summer Olympics.

References

External links
 

1937 births
Living people
Lebanese male foil fencers
Olympic fencers of Lebanon
Fencers at the 1968 Summer Olympics
Fencers at the 1972 Summer Olympics
Lebanese male épée fencers